In enzymology, a vinylacetyl-CoA Delta-isomerase is an enzyme that catalyzes the chemical reaction

vinylacetyl-CoA  crotonyl-CoA

Hence, this enzyme has one substrate, vinylacetyl-CoA, and one product, crotonyl-CoA.

This enzyme belongs to the family of isomerases, specifically those intramolecular oxidoreductases transposing C=C bonds.  The systematic name of this enzyme class is vinylacetyl-CoA Delta3-Delta2-isomerase. Other names in common use include vinylacetyl coenzyme A Delta-isomerase, vinylacetyl coenzyme A isomerase, and Delta3-cis-Delta2-trans-enoyl-CoA isomerase.  This enzyme participates in butanoate metabolism.

Structural studies

As of late 2007, only one structure has been solved for this class of enzymes, with the PDB accession code .

References

 
 

EC 5.3.3
Enzymes of known structure